Alberico Passadore (born 18 March 1960) is a former Uruguayan rugby union footballer and a current coach. He played as a scrum-half.

Passadore had 5 caps for Uruguay, from 1989 to 1995, scoring a try.

He was the head coach of the "Teros" until being forced to leave functions, in October 2008, for professional reasons. His main purpose of qualifying for the 2011 Rugby World Cup finals, was followed by his successor, Argentine Guillermo García Porcel.

External links 
 Alberico Passadore Statistics
 Alberico Passadore International Statistics
 Guillermo García Porcel Succeeds Alberico Passadore as Uruguay Head Coach

1960 births
Living people
Uruguayan rugby union players
Uruguayan rugby union coaches
Rugby union scrum-halves
Uruguay international rugby union players
Uruguay national rugby union team coaches